João Paulo de Souza Mares (born 7 January 2000), known as Bitello, is a Brazilian professional footballer who plays as a central midfielder for Grêmio.

Career
Born in Formosa do Oeste, Brazil, Bitello joined the Grêmio's Academy at the age of 18 in 2018.

Career statistics

Honours
Grêmio
Campeonato Gaúcho: 2021, 2022
Recopa Gaúcha: 2021, 2022

References

External links

Profile at the Grêmio F.B.P.A. website

2000 births
Living people
Sportspeople from Paraná (state)
Brazilian footballers
Association football midfielders
Campeonato Brasileiro Série B players
Campeonato Paranaense players
FC Cascavel players
Grêmio Foot-Ball Porto Alegrense players